On Reflection: The Very Best of Elaine Paige is a compilation album by Elaine Paige, released in 1998.

It is primarily a compilation of material from earlier recordings, including much of the same material as her earlier Encore album, but also includes the 1998 version of "Memory", taken from the video version of Cats released that year.

"I Dreamed a Dream" and "Don't Cry for Me Argentina" are live performances taken from the recording of a 1993 concert which was broadcast by the BBC.

The album was released on the Telstar label and featured tracks recorded for Paige's WEA albums.

Track listing

 "Memory" (Andrew Lloyd Webber/T.S. Eliot/Trevor Nunn) (Previously unreleased on CD. This 1998 re-recording is taken from the film version of Cats)
 "I Don't Know How to Love Him" (Andrew Lloyd Webber/Tim Rice)
 "The Perfect Year" (Andrew Lloyd Webber/Don Black/Christopher Hampton)
 "I Dreamed a Dream" (live) (Claude-Michel Schönberg/Alain Boublil/Jean-Marc Natel)
 "Non, Je Ne Regrette Rien" (Charles Dumont/Édith Piaf)
 "Another Suitcase in Another Hall" (Andrew Lloyd Webber/Tim Rice)
 "On My Own" (Claude-Michel Schönberg/Alain Boublil/Herbert Kretzmer/Jean-Marc Natel)
 "Walking in the Air" (Howard Blake)
 "Wishin' on a Star" (Billie Calvin)
 "Don't Cry for Me Argentina" (live) (Andrew Lloyd Webber/Tim Rice)
 "As If We Never Said Goodbye" (Andrew Lloyd Webber/Don Black/Christopher Hampton/Amy Powers)
 "The Rose" (Amanda McBroom)
 "Hymne à l'Amour(If You Love Me)"  (Marguerite Monnot/Édith Piaf/Geoffrey Parsons)
 "The Way We Were" (Alan Bergman/Marilyn Bergman/Marvin Hamlisch)
 "The Second Time" (Francis Lai/Tim Rice)
 "The Windmills of Your Mind" (Michel Legrand/Alan Bergman/Marilyn Bergman)
 "I Know Him So Well" (Benny Andersson/Tim Rice/Björn Ulvaeus)

Elaine Paige albums
1998 greatest hits albums
Albums produced by Tony Visconti
Albums produced by Andrew Lloyd Webber
Albums produced by Nigel Wright